Han Qingsong (born 5 December 1987) is a Chinese footballer of Korean descent who currently plays as a defender for Qingdao Huanghai.

Club career
Han Qingsong started his professional football career in 2005 when he was promoted to China League One side Yanbian FC's first team squad. He scored his first senior goal on 18 September 2010 in a 2–1 away defeat against Guangzhou Evergrande. He made a brief trail with K League club Suwon Samsung Bluewings in January 2011.

Han transferred to fellow League One side Chongqing Lifan on 4 January 2012. On 17 March 2012, he made his debut for Chongqing in a 2–0 away defeat against Shanghai East Asia. He missed all 2014 league matches due to severe injury. Han joined another League One club Qingdao Hainiu on 14 February 2015. On 11 March 2016, he received a ban of two months by the Chinese Football Association for age falsification which he changed his age from 5 December 1987 to 5 February 1987.

Han returned to Yanbian Funde on 30 December 2016. He made his Super League debut on 5 March 2017 in a 0–0 away draw against Chongqing Lifan.

Han transferred back to Qingdao Huanghai in February 2019. In his return to the club he would help the team to win the 2019 China League One division and promotion into the top tier.

Career statistics 
Statistics accurate as of match played 31 December 2020.

Honours

Club
Chongqing Lifan
China League One: 2014

Qingdao Huanghai
China League One: 2019

References

External links
 

1987 births
Living people
People from Yanbian
Chinese footballers
Footballers from Jilin
Chinese people of Korean descent
Yanbian Funde F.C. players
Qingdao F.C. players
Chongqing Liangjiang Athletic F.C. players
Chinese Super League players
China League One players
Association football defenders